Thika Road (commonly known as the Thika Superhighway) is an 8-lane controlled-access highway in Kenya, with 12 lanes in some sections. It links the capital city of Nairobi with the industrial town of Thika.  The Thika Road forms 50 km of the A2 Highway, which is part of the Cape to Cairo Road. In Kenya, it links Namanga at the Tanzania-Kenya  border to the Kenya-Ethiopia  border town of Moyale.

Construction 

As industrial development increased along the A2 Highway, the existing road became very congested. It took 2 hours to drive the 50-km stretch to Thika, and road accidents were common. A superhighway would make the drive safer and allow the trip to be completed in just 40 minutes, and under.

Construction of Thika Superhighway began in January 2009 and ended with its inauguration in November 2012 by the then President of the Republic of Kenya, Mwai Kibaki. The highway was divided into three parts, each awarded to a different contractor. China Wu Yi built the section from the Uhuru Highway to Muthaiga Roundabout, Sinohydro built from the Muthaiga Roundabout to Kenyatta University, and Shengli Engineering completed the highway to Thika.

The total cost of the project was Ksh 32 billion ( million). The funding was provided by the African Development Bank ( million), the Exim Bank of China ( million), and the Kenyan government ( million).

The section between Muthaiga roundabout and Ruiru town is considered to be a part of the Nairobi Northern Bypass, connecting to the Limuru Road....

See also
 2014 Nairobi bus bombings
 Nairobi Bypasses

References 

Streets in Nairobi
Kiambu County